USS Cepheus may refer to one of these two ships of the United States Navy named after the northern constellation of Cepheus:

 , launched on 23 October 1943 and transferred to the US Navy on 15 December 1943.
 , acquired from the US Army on 12 June 1951 and lent to South Korea the same day.

United States Navy ship names